Thick-film dielectric electroluminescent technology (TDEL) is a phosphor-based flat panel display technology developed by Canadian company iFire Technology Corp. TDEL is based on inorganic electroluminescent (IEL) technology that combines both thick-and thin-film processes.

Technology

The TDEL structure is made with glass or other substrates, consisting of a thick-film dielectric layer and a thin-film phosphor layer sandwiched between two sets of electrodes to create a matrix of pixels. Inorganic phosphors within this matrix emit light in the presence of an alternating electric field.

Color By Blue

Color By Blue (CBB) was developed in 2003. The Color By Blue process achieves higher luminance and better performance than the previous triple pattern process, with increased contrast, grayscale rendition, and color uniformity across the panel.

Color By Blue is based on the physics of photoluminescence. High luminance inorganic blue phosphor is used in combination with specialized color conversion materials, which absorb the blue light and re-emit red or green light, to generate the other colors. This fluorescence is possible because the photons in blue light operate at higher frequencies than other light.

References

External links
iFire's home page
Globe and Mail article about iFire and the technology.

Emerging technologies
Luminescence
Display technology